R-25.1 regional road is a Montenegrin roadway. It serves as a connection from R-25 regional road to bottom of the stairs that lead to top of Lovćen and Mausoleum of Njegoš.

History

In November 2019, the Government of Montenegro published bylaw on categorisation of state roads. With new categorisation, R-25.1 regional road was created from municipal road.

Major intersections

References

R-25.1